Formaggio di Fossa (Pit's cheese in italian) is a cheese from Sogliano al Rubicone in the Emilia-Romagna region of Italy. The cheese's name, which literally means "cheese of the pit", is derived from the process of ripening the cheese in special pits dug in tuff rock. The cheese is currently produced in the areas between the Rubicon and Marecchia river valleys. In 2009 formaggio di fossa was granted Denominazione di Origine Protetta status, the Italian equivalent of protected designation of origin.

Production process
Fossa cheese is made with either sheep's milk, cow's milk, or a mixture of the two. The cheese typically matures around 30 days before being placed in the "fossa", a pit dug into the ground and lined with straw. The pit is prepared by burning straw inside to remove moisture and sterilize the space. The cheese is wrapped in cloth bags and placed in the pit, which is then closed off entirely while the cheese matures for an additional 80 to 100 days. The sealing of the pit limits the oxygen available to the cheese, enabling a process of anaerobic fermentation. After being removed from the pit, the cheese is allowed to ripen for an additional three months. The technique of making formaggio di fossa dates back to the 15th century.

See also
 Ambra di Talamello – a type of Formaggio di Fossa
 List of cheeses

References

Italian cheeses
Italian products with protected designation of origin
Cheeses with designation of origin protected in the European Union
Cuisine of Emilia-Romagna